The Protestant cemetery Bergisch Gladbach road ( Highway 506 ) in Mülheim district of Cologne existed since the beginning of the 17th century and is one of the oldest preserved cemeteries in Cologne, Germany. The cemetery is still in operation and used for burials.

History
The roughly rectangular cemetery site was established in 1612 by the Reformed congregation and the Lutheran church was allowed to share the use of the cemetery. One of the first graves – the grave of Gertrude Stein Tilman
(deceased on 25 May 1614) at the entrance – has remained to this day, as well as some elaborate family tombs and mausoleums, many of them dating back to 18th and 19th century. The wall surrounding the cemetery today was built in 1880.

Since 1981, the Protestant Cemetery Mülheim is under monument and cultural heritage protection.

References
 Günter Leitner: Friedhöfe in Köln. Mitten im Leben, Köln 2003.
 Ilse Prass: Mülheim am Rhein. Bachem Verlag, Köln 1988, .
 Wilma Falk-van Rees, Dietrich Grütjen, Annette Scholl (Hrsg.): Ich weisz an welchen ich glaube. Ein Rundgang über den evangelischen Friedhof in Köln-Mülheim. Köln 2010, .

External links
 Evangelischer Friedhof Köln-Mülheim – Maps
 Evangelischer Friedhof Köln-Mülheim – Köln
 Bilderrahmenwerk
 

Cemeteries in Cologne
Protestant Reformed cemeteries
Mülheim, Cologne
Lutheran cemeteries in Germany